Domen Pociecha (born October 21, 1985 in Kisovec) is a Slovenian luger who has competed since 1998. Competing in two Winter Olympics, he earned his best finish of 26th in the men's singles event at Turin in 2006.

Pociecha's best finish at the FIL World Luge Championships was 31st in the men's singles event at Oberhof in 2008. His best finish at the FIL European Luge Championships was 27th twice in the men's singles event (2006, 2010).

References
 2006 luge men's singles results
 FIL-Luge profile
 SIOL.NET profile

External links 
 
 
 

1985 births
Living people
Slovenian male lugers
Olympic lugers of Slovenia
Lugers at the 2006 Winter Olympics
Lugers at the 2010 Winter Olympics
People from the Municipality of Zagorje ob Savi